Stephen Wrigley (born 18 April 1987) is a former professional Australian rules football player at the Brisbane Lions in the Australian Football League (AFL). He was recruited by the club in the 2012 Rookie draft, with pick #22. Wrigley made his debut in Round 18, 2012, against  at Subiaco Oval.

He was delisted by the Brisbane Lions at the end of the 2013 season.

References

External links

1987 births
Living people
Brisbane Lions players
Australian rules footballers from Queensland
Labrador Australian Football Club players